The  is a commuter electric multiple unit type operated by Nagoya Railroad (Meitetsu) in Japan since 1978. There is also a 200 series type, operated since 1991, which is very similar to the 100 series. The 100 series and 200 series trains run on the Inuyama Line and Toyota Line and provide through service to the Tsurumai Line in Nagoya Municipal Subway.

References

External links
 

Electric multiple units of Japan
100 series
Train-related introductions in 1978

Nippon Sharyo multiple units
1500 V DC multiple units of Japan